Naseer Ismail (born 10 July 1975) is a former athlete from the Maldives who competed in the middle- and long-distance running events. He represented his country at two consecutive Summer Olympics, starting in 1996, as well as three World Championships.

Competition record
local competition records.

Personal bests
Outdoor
800 metres – 1:53.08 (Kathmandu 1999) NR
1500 metres – 3:57.54 (1993)
Half marathon – 1:21:55 (Vilamoura 2003) NR
Indoor
800 metres – 1:58.17 (Maebashi 1999) NR

References

External links
 

1975 births
Living people
Maldivian male middle-distance runners
Maldivian male sprinters
Olympic athletes of the Maldives
Athletes (track and field) at the 1996 Summer Olympics
Athletes (track and field) at the 2000 Summer Olympics
Commonwealth Games competitors for the Maldives
Athletes (track and field) at the 1994 Commonwealth Games
Athletes (track and field) at the 1998 Commonwealth Games
Athletes (track and field) at the 1998 Asian Games
World Athletics Championships athletes for the Maldives
Asian Games competitors for the Maldives